James William Trippett (1909–2002) was an English swimmer.

Swimming
He won Gold in the 100 Yard Backstroke at the 1930 British Empire Games for England.

Personal life
He was a police constable at the time of the 1930 Games and lived in Sheffield.

References

1909 births
2002 deaths
English male swimmers
Commonwealth Games medallists in swimming
Commonwealth Games gold medallists for England
Swimmers at the 1930 British Empire Games
Medallists at the 1930 British Empire Games